Talkin' Honky Blues is a studio album by Canadian hip hop musician Buck 65. It was released on WEA in 2003. The album won the 2004 Juno Award for Alternative Album of the Year.

Critical reception
Sean Carruthers of AllMusic gave the album 4 stars out of 5, saying: "Instead of jazzy or funky backing tracks, most of the tracks here crib heavily from country, which is where the 'honky' comes in: this is the sort of thing that Buck 65 grew up with and what influenced him." He described it as "a beat poetry album with hip hop beats." Rollie Pemberton of Pitchfork gave the album a 7.6 out of 10, saying, "[Buck 65] has discovered a happy medium between folk and rap, turning his initial disdain for the lack of innovation in hip-hop into a more diverse sound." Terry Sawyer of PopMatters named it the best album of 2003.

In 2005, Jason Richards of Now called it "[Buck 65's] most accessible album". In 2007, Dan Weiss of Stylus Magazine placed it at number 6 on the "Top 10 Alt-Country Greats Not Recorded by Uncle Tupelo" list.

Track listing

Personnel
Credits adapted from liner notes.

 Buck 65 – lyrics, beats, turntables, recording, mixing
 Graeme Campbell – MIDI, other computer stuff, recording, mixing
 Charles Austin – guitar, stringed things, recording, mixing
 Dale Murray – pedal steel guitar
 Andrew Glencross – keyboards
 Michael Catano – drums
 Bob Ludwig – mastering
 Jenn McIntyre – art direction, design, illustration
 Ingram Barss – photography
 Jenn McIntyre – photography
 Patrick Duffy – layout
 Jenn Hirst – A&R
 Steve Blair – A&R

Charts

References

External links
 

2003 albums
Buck 65 albums
Warner Music Group albums
Juno Award for Alternative Album of the Year albums